Ernest Arthur Aitchison (10 June 1905 – 25 January 1991) was an Australian rules footballer who played with Hawthorn in the Victorian Football League (VFL).

Notes

External links

1905 births
1991 deaths
Australian rules footballers from Victoria (Australia)
Hawthorn Football Club players